Elysair SAS, operating as L'Avion (French for "The plane"), was an airline headquartered in Paray Vieille Poste, France, near Wissous. 

It operated business class-only long-haul service between Orly Airport, Paris and Newark Liberty International Airport in the USA. 

The airline was sold to British Airways and has since merged with OpenSkies, a wholly owned subsidiary of British Airways.

History
Founded by young French entrepreneur Frantz Yvelin and run by CEO Marc Rochet and Frantz Yvelin, L'Avion was the marketing name for Elysair. It had been created as Elysair but changed to use the marketing name "L'AVION" in late autumn 2006 after market research showed the new name tested well in the US and in France. L'Avion kept Elysair as its call sign and corporate name. The first flight was on 3 January 2007 from Paris to Newark. The airline did have plans to expand to the Middle East.

Similar to the concept that was later used by Silverjet, L'Avion offered a premium-only service on TransAtlantic routes. It used two Boeing 757-200 aircraft, maintained by Lufthansa Technik (and modified by Gamco in Abu Dhabi) with detailed engineering and on site supervision at Gamco by Northview Aviation. H4 Aerospace helped to undertake certification. The Aircraft were configured with a total of only 90 seats in a 2x2 configuration. The seating and service level was all Business class. It offered laptop power at every seat, French food and wine, and seats that reclined by 140 degrees. L'Avion featured "On-Demand" digEplayer XT individual units with a 7" screen.

L'Avion was wholly owned by Société de Participation Aérienne (SPA) and had about 100 employees in 2008. On 2 July 2008 British Airways announced it had agreed to buy L'Avion for £54 million. The deal was completed in July 2008 and resulted in the full integration of L'Avion with OpenSkies. Operations of the two airlines were merged on 4 April 2009, with the former now operating as OpenSkies, a wholly British Airways owned French airline subsidiary.

Destinations

Paris - Orly Airport base

Newark - Newark Liberty International Airport

Fleet

When merged with OpenSkies, the L'Avion fleet consisted of the following aircraft:

See also 
 Eos Airlines
 MAXjet Airways
 Silverjet
 La Compagnie

References

External links 

 
 

			 

 
Airlines established in 2006
Airlines disestablished in 2008
Defunct airlines of France
Business class airlines